In the Shadow of the Wind is a Canadian drama film, directed by Yves Simoneau and released in 1986. It was entered into the 37th Berlin International Film Festival.

Based on the novel by Anne Hébert, the film depicts a small town in the Gaspésie region of Quebec shaken by a rape and murder in 1936. The story is depicted from the perspective of Stevens Brown, played by Steve Banner in the 1936 storyline and by Jean-Louis Millette as an old man in the present day reflecting on the events. The cast also includes Charlotte Valandrey, Laure Marsac, Marie Tifo and Lothaire Bluteau.

The film was originally slated to be directed by Francis Mankiewicz, but he left the production due to a creative dispute with the producers. The community in Hébert's novel was an Anglo-Quebecer village, but the film's primary expected audience was a francophone audience in Quebec, leading to a dispute about whether to shoot the film in English and then dub it into French or vice versa.

The film received four Genie Award nominations at the 8th Genie Awards in 1987: Best Supporting Actress (Tifo), Best Art Direction/Production Design (Michel Proulx), Best Cinematography (Alain Dostie) and Best Costume Design (Nicole Pelletier).

Cast
 Steve Banner as Stevens Brown
 Charlotte Valandrey as Olivia Atkins
 Laure Marsac as Nora Atkins
 Angèle Coutu as Maureen
 Paul Hébert as Thimothe Brown
 Marie Tifo as Irene Jones
 Bernard-Pierre Donnadieu as Priest
 Lothaire Bluteau as Perceval Brown
 Roland Chenail
 Guy Thauvette as Patrick Atkins
 Pierre Powers as Sydney Atkins
 Henri Chassé as Bob
 Denise Gagnon
 Jocelyn Bérubé
 Jean-Louis Millette as Vieux Stevens

References

External links

1986 films
1986 drama films
Canadian drama films
Films directed by Yves Simoneau
Films based on Canadian novels
French-language Canadian films
1980s Canadian films